Below you'll find all participating squads of the 1996 Men's Olympic Volleyball Tournament, organised by the world's governing body, the FIVB in conjunction with the IOC. It was held from 21 July to 4 August 1996 in the Stegeman Coliseum and the Omni Coliseum of The University of Georgia in Atlanta, Georgia (United States).

Pool A

Fernando Borrero
Jorge Elgueta
Sebastián Firpo
Sebastián Jabif
Leonardo Maly
Guillermo Martínez
Marcos Milincovic 
Pablo Pereira
Guillermo Quaini
Eduardo Rodríguez
Alejandro Romano
Javier Weber (c)
Head coach:Daniel Castellani

Gilson Bernardo 
Nalbert Bitencourt 
Giovane Gávio 
Antonio Carlos Gouveia 
Mauricio Lima 
Fábio Marcelino 
Marcelo Negrão 
Cássio Pereira 
Max Pereira 
Alexandre Samuel 
Carlos Schwanke 
Paulo André Silva
Head coach:José Roberto Guimarães

Lubomir Ganev 
Ivaylo Gavrilov 
Plamen Hristov 
Evgeni Ivanov 
Nikolay Ivanov 
Plamen Konstantinov 
Lyudmil Naydenov 
Nayden Naydenov 
Petar Ouzounov 
Martin Stoev 
Dimo Tonev (c) 
Nikolay Jeliazkov
Head coach:Bogdan Kjutchoukov

Alexis Batle 
Angel Beltrán 
Fredy Brooks 
Joel Despaigne 
Raúl Diago 
Jhosvany Hernández 
Osvaldo Hernández 
Lazaro Martín 
Alain Roca 
Rodolfo Sanchez 
Ricardo Vantes
Nicolas Vives
Head coach:Juan Díaz Marino

Damian Dacewicz 
Piotr Gruszka 
Krzysztof Janczak 
Marcin Nowak 
Robert Prygiel 
Witold Roman (c)
Krzysztof Śmigiel 
Andrzej Stelmach 
Krzysztof Stelmach 
Mariusz Szyszko 
Leszek Urbanowicz
Paweł Zagumny
Head coach:Wiktor Krebok

Lloy Ball
Bob Ctvrtlik
Scott Fortune
John Hyden
Bryan Ivie
Michael Lambert
Dan Landry
Jeff Nygaard
Tom Sorensen
Jeff Stork
Ethan Watts
Brett Winslow
Head coach:Fred Sturm

Pool B

Lorenzo Bernardi 
Vigor Bovolenta 
Marco Bracci 
Luca Cantagalli 
Andrea Gardini 
Andrea Giani 
Pasquale Gravina 
Marco Meoni 
Samuele Papi 
Andrea Sartoretti 
Paolo Tofoli
Andrea Zorzi
Head coach:Julio Velasco

Peter Blangé
Bas van de Goor
Mike van de Goor
Rob Grabert
Henk-Jan Held
Guido Görtzen
Misha Latuhihin 
Olof van der Meulen 
Jan Posthuma
Brecht Rodenburg
Richard Schuil
Ronald Zwerver
Head coach:Joop Alberda

Oleg Chatounov 
Pavel Chichkin 
Igor Chulepov 
Stanislav Dineikine 
Dmitry Fomin 
Valery Goryuchev
Alexey Kazakov 
Vadim Khamuttskikh 
Ruslan Olikhver 
Sergey Orlenko 
Konstantin Ushakov
Serguei Tetioukine
Head coach:Vyatcheslav Platonov

Bang Sin-Bong 
Shin Young-Chul 
Choi Cheon-Sik 
Ha Jong-Hwa 
Im Do-Hun 
Kim Sang-Woo 
Kim Se-Jin 
Lee Sung-Hee
Park Hee-Sang 
Park Seon-chul 
Sin Jin-sik
Sin Jeong-seop
Head coach:Song Man-Duck

Tarek Aouni 
Mohamed Baghdadi 
Khaled Belaïd 
Faycal Ben Amara 
Hichem Ben Romdhane 
Riadh Ghandri
Noureddine Hfaiedh 
Ghazi Koubba 
Atif Loukil 
Riadh Hedhili 
Ghazi Guidara
Majdi Toumi
Head coach:Fathi M'Kaouar

Vladimir Batez 
Dejan Brđović (c)
Đorđe Đurić 
Andrija Gerić 
Nikola Grbić 
Vladimir Grbić
Rajko Jokanović 
Slobodan Kovač 
Đula Mešter 
Željko Tanasković 
Žarko Petrović
Goran Vujević
Head coach:Zoran Gajić

References

External links
Team rosters at Todor66.com

1996
Men's team rosters